Melaleuca croxfordiae is a plant in the myrtle family, Myrtaceae and is endemic to the far south-west of corner Western Australia. It is a paperbark, usually growing in winter-wet places, with long, narrow leaves and a few small creamy coloured flower heads in early summer .

Description
They are also flat and soft and have a very short stalk.

This species has a few heads of flowers, white to creamy-yellow, borne at the ends of branches which continue to grow after flowering, sometimes also in the upper leaf axils. There are five bundles of stamens around the flower, each with 5 to 8 stamens.

Taxonomy and naming
Melaleuca croxfordiae was first formally described in 1999 by Lyndley Craven from a specimen found near Albany. The specific epithet (croxfordiae) honours Eileen Jessie Croxford who helped professional biologists in understanding the flora of the Albany district.

Distribution and habitat
Melaleuca croxfordiae occurs in the near the coast between Manjimup and Albany in the Esperance Plains, Jarrah Forest, Mallee and Warren biogeographic regions. It grows in sandy soils, often over granite in swamps and coastal heath.

Conservation status
This melaleuca is listed as "not threatened" by the Government of Western Australia Department of Parks and Wildlife.

References

croxfordiae
Plants described in 1999
Endemic flora of Western Australia
Taxa named by Lyndley Craven